The Leeds Knights are a professional ice hockey team based in Leeds, West Yorkshire, England. The team is a member of the National League and plays at Planet Ice Leeds.

History
The team was announced, along with the new National League, on 16 March 2019. However, rumours of a Leeds-based team playing out of the 1800 capacity Planet Ice Leeds arena were circulating months beforehand. In joining the league, they became the first ever hockey team to play out of the city.

The Chiefs name was selected by Planet Ice following the results of a fan poll. The 'Chiefs' moniker won the poll, results of which were announced on 16 May 2019, having beaten the alternatives; Cotton Kings and Mighty Mammoths.

Former Whitley Warriors Defenceman Sam Zajac was announced as Player-coach of the team on 10 May 2019. Zajac's first signing for the Chiefs was former Manchester Phoenix captain, Defenceman Luke Boothroyd.

In November 2019, head coach Sam Zajac launched an urgent appeal after a large amount of the team's equipment was stolen from an apartment block in Batley. This included new helmets that hadn't even been worn yet, along with sticks and gloves used by the players all season. Despite this, the Chiefs confirmed their weekend games would go ahead as planned via a statement on Twitter.

In their first National League season, the Chiefs finished 10th. They won 13 games, losing 36, achieving 28 points overall. The season was curtailed in March 2020, due to the COVID-19 pandemic. For the first five months of the season, the Chiefs were required to play home games elsewhere, due to a delay in the opening of their rink. The first game at their Elland Road arena was against Sheffield Steeldogs on 31 January 2020.

In 2021, the club rebranded and changed their name from Leeds Chiefs to Leeds Knights due to a change in ownership. The new name has ties to Leeds Armouries. David Whistle arrived as Head Coach and General Manager, but departed in January 2022. Former Swindon Wildcats coach Ryan Aldridge was then appointed as interim coach until the end of the 2021/22 season.

Club roster 2022–23
(*) Denotes a Non-British Trained player (Import)

Source:

2021/22 Departures

References

External links
 NEWS

Sport in Leeds
Sport in West Yorkshire
Ice hockey teams in England
Ice hockey clubs established in 2019
2019 establishments in England